Jihad al-Akbar is the lectures of Imam Khomeini in Najaf, which was published in 1991 by the institute for compilation and publication of Imam Khomeini's works.

Etymology
Jihad in Islam means striving way of God.(al-jihad fi sabil Allah)

In the Islamic view, jihad is two types:
 External jihad ( physical jihad):
Jihad (the help of God's religion) is with pen or tongue or sword.
 Inner jihad ( spiritual or jihad al-nafs ):
Jihad al-nafs is against all evil, anger, lust, insatiable imagination and any other bad morality in humans.
Ja'far al-Sadiq, the sixth Imam of Shiites, said: “The Muhammad dispatched a military unit to the battlefront for defense. Upon their (successful) return, he said to them "Blessed are the people who did the jihad al-Asghar" but yet jihad al-Akbar has remained. Practices of the Religion jihad al-nafs was called jihad al-Akbar and physical jihad was called jihad al-Asghar.

Context
In this book, Imam Khomeini Orders to Persons and students and clerics who do Jihad al-nafs. "It is necessary that you purify yourself so that when you become a head of an institution or a community you purify them and in this way take a step to rectify and build a society". Find a good teacher and participate in ethics classes."The possibility of evil propagation and unclean hands intervening and portraying the phenomenon of having an ethical programme of rectifying one-self as unimportant eventually corrupts the hawza". In the thought of Imam Khomeini, human learns to Loss of worldly likings and self-giving to God. Imam says: People should not be proud of reaching a high position (scientific, material, political, etc).

See also
Islamic Government: Governance of the Jurist
Tahrir al-Wasilah
The Unveiling of Secrets
Forty Hadith of Ruhullah Khomeini
Kashf al-Asrar

References

1940 non-fiction books
Ruhollah Khomeini
Shia literature
Political science books
Islamist works
Iranian Revolution
Books of lectures